Dugald MacFarlane (24 August 1880 – 22 April 1965) was an English professional footballer who played for Barrow, Burnley and Tottenham Hotspur.

Football career 
MacFarlane began his career with his home town club Barrow. His goal scoring ability attracted the attention of Burnley where he played 121 matches and found the net on 35 occasions between 1903–1907. He signed for Tottenham Hotspur in June 1908 and made his debut in the White Hart Lane's club first fixture in the Football League at home versus Wolverhampton Wanderers on 1 September 1908. The forward featured in 21 matches and scored twice for the Lilywhites  before re-joining Barrow to end his playing career.

MacFarlane died in Barrow in Furness on 22 April 1965.

References 

1880 births
1965 deaths
Footballers from Barrow-in-Furness
English footballers
English Football League players
Barrow A.F.C. players
Burnley F.C. players
Tottenham Hotspur F.C. players
Association football forwards
Footballers from Cumbria